Přemysl Hajný (December 18, 1925 - October 24, 1993) was an ice hockey player for the Czechoslovak national team. He won a silver medal at the 1948 Winter Olympics.

References 

1925 births
1993 deaths
Ice hockey players at the 1948 Winter Olympics
Olympic ice hockey players of Czechoslovakia
Olympic medalists in ice hockey
Olympic silver medalists for Czechoslovakia
Medalists at the 1948 Winter Olympics
HC Slavia Praha players
Rytíři Kladno players
Czech ice hockey defencemen
Czechoslovak ice hockey defencemen
Ice hockey people from Prague
Czech ice hockey coaches
Czechoslovak ice hockey coaches
Czechoslovak expatriate ice hockey people
Czechoslovak expatriate sportspeople in Switzerland